The Pearson 23 is an American trailerable sailboat that was designed by William Shaw as a cruiser and first built in 1978.

The Pearson 23C is a 1983 cat rigged development of the sloop-rigged Pearson 23.

Production
The design was built by Pearson Yachts in the United States from 1978 until 1981 with 42 boats completed, but it is now out of production.

Design
The Pearson 23 is a recreational keelboat, built predominantly of fiberglass, with wood trim and a masthead sloop rig. The hull has a raked stem, a plumb transom, a transom-hung rudder controlled by a tiller and a fixed fin keel or optional keel and centerboard. It displaces  and carries  of ballast.

The boat is normally fitted with a small  outboard motor for docking and maneuvering.

The design has sleeping accommodation for four people, with a double "V"-berth in the bow cabin and two straight settee beryhs in the main cabin. The galley is located under the companionway ladder and is equipped with a  stove and a sink. The head is located just aft of the bow cabin on the port side.

Operational history
The boat is supported by an active class club, the Pearson Yachts Portal.

In a 2010 review Steve Henkel wrote, "this boat is the sloop version of the Pearson 23 catboat ... Both versions used virtually the same hull molds and tooling ... The sloop came with either a fin keel with external lead ballast, or a keel-centerboard combination, as did the cat ... However, the sloop has a shorter mast (31 feet off the water instead of 36 1/2 feet for the cat), about 10% more sail area (229 sq, ft. vs. 210 for the cat), and includes the performance benefits contributed by the slot effect inherent in the sloop and missing in the cat configuration. Best features: Quality construction and a wholesome design make her a good starter sailboat for cruising. Worst features: Not the easiest boat to launch from a trailer, whether fin-keeler or centerboarder."

See also
List of sailing boat types

References

Keelboats
1970s sailboat type designs
Sailing yachts
Trailer sailers
Sailboat type designs by William Shaw
Sailboat types built by Pearson Yachts